The  is a limited express train service in Japan operated by East Japan Railway Company (JR East).

Station stops
Shiosai services operate over the Sōbu Main Line, stopping at the stations listed below. No services operate as "Local" all-stations services in any section; this characteristic is different from that of Wakashio ltd.exp..

 -  -  -  -  -  -  -  -  -  - 
 No.1 & 12 trains also stop at   station.
 No.2, 4 & 13 trains also stop at  station.

Rolling stock

 255 series 9-car EMUs (since 10 December 2005)
 E257-500 series 5/10-car EMUs

Shiosai services are operated using Makuhari-based 9-car 255 series EMU and 10-car E257-500 series EMU formations. The E257-500 series formations have no Green (first class) cars.

Past rolling stock
 183 series EMUs (10 March 1975 – 2005)

Formations
Trains are formed as shown below, with car 1 at the Tokyo end.

9-car 255 series

As of 2019, cars no. 2 and 3 are reserved on some services.

5+5-car E257 series

Past formations

Trains were originally formed of 9-car 183 series EMUs, including one Green car, or 6-car sets with no Green car, but from December 1994, services were formed of 8-car 183 series sets with the Green car removed, as shown below.

8-car 183 series

History

From the start of the November 1982 timetable revision, further 183 series EMUs were drafted in, displaced from Toki limited express services following the opening of the Joetsu Shinkansen, and the remaining Inubō express services were discontinued and absorbed into the Shiosai services, giving seven return workings daily.

From the start of the revised timetable on 10 December 2005, 255 series 9-car EMUs were introduced on Shiosai services. From the same date, services were made entirely no-smoking.

From the start of the 14 March 2015 timetable revision, all Shiosai services started and terminated at Tokyo Station, with no services operating from Shinjuku.

See also
 List of named passenger trains of Japan

References

External links

 JR East 255 series Shiosai/Wakashio/Sazanami 
 JR East E257 series Wakashio/Sazanami/Shiosai/Ayame 

Named passenger trains of Japan
East Japan Railway Company
Railway services introduced in 1975
1975 establishments in Japan